C. Kesavan (23 May 1891 – 7 July 1969) was a politician, social reformer, statesman and the Chief Minister of Travancore-Cochin during 1950–1952. He led the Nivarthana agitation in Travancore to gain the democratic authority for the citizens to decide on the legislation and to attain opportunities regardless of caste or social and economical status.

Life 
He was born in 1891 in the village of Mayyanad, near Kollam in the then princely state of Travancore. For some time he worked as a teacher and then took a law degree from Thiruvananthapuram and started practice in Kollam.

Kesavan was influenced by the work of Padmanabhan Palpu, the social reform campaigner who was a member of the backward Ezhava community and a founder of the Sree Narayana Dharma Paripalana Yogam (SNDP) association where he later rose to the general secretary post. He became an activist for the Ezhava caste, seeking an improved socio-economic position for them, and in the 1930s he suggested that they should abandon Hinduism. Thus he was an atheist. Kesavan was influenced by the teachings of Sree Narayana Guru, Gandhiji and Karl Marx. He worked for temperance and eradication of untouchability and served as General Secretary of SNDP Yogam.

From 1933, Kesavan was one of the prominent leaders of Abstention movement or Nivarthana Prakshobham in Travancore of present-day Kerala. Because of a speech he made at a public meeting in Kozhencherry he was arrested on 7 June 1935, tried for sedition, and sentenced to two years imprisonment. 

Kesavan took an active part in organizing Travancore State Congress and became a member of its working Committee. During the agitation for responsible government in Travancore, he was arrested several times. During Quit India Movement in 1942, Kesavan was sentenced to one year simple imprisonment and was released on 19 July 1943. After independence, Kesava was elected to Travancore Assembly and became a member of the first cabinet headed by Pattom Thanu Pillai, but resigned after few months. Kesavan became Chief Minister of the erstwhile Travancore-Cochin (Thiruvithamkoor-Kochi) state in 1951 and was elected to State Assembly in 1952. Kesavan was considered to be one of the Triumvirate of Travancore (Thiruvithaamkoor) State Congress leadership, the other two being Pattom A. Thanu Pillai and T.M. Varghese.

Kesavan wrote an incomplete autobiography, Jeevitha-Samaram, consisting of two volumes that described his life up to the time of his political prominence. A third volume was planned to cover that later period but was unwritten at the time of his death. The work combined the story of his own life with a wider narrative concerning the plight of the Ezhava caste of which he was a member. Udaya Kumar says that his "early memories are tinged with two lines of injustice: the discrimination he suffered as an Ezhava boy on the streets and other public places, where he was forced to defer to upper-caste people, and the unjust exercise of authority by the elders and the upper sub-divisions within the Ezhava caste".

The Kollam Corporation Town Hall was named the C. Kesavan Memorial Municipal Town Hall in Kesavan's memory. It is on the National Highway passing through the Kollam Cantonment. The building is now one of the main venues for several cultural events and meetings. He was instrumental in starting the Medical College at Thiruvananthapuram. He has also worked for establishing a Govt. Hospital in his home town Mayyanad which functioned well in its helm days and later shrank to a health center.

As Chief Minister 
Kesavan was sworn in as Chief Minister of Travancore-Cochin on 3 March 1951. T.K. Narayana Pillai and A. J. John were the ministers. Both the ministers resigned in September 1951. New ministers sworn in were: K.M. Kora (Finance & Food), G. Chandrasekhara Pillai (PWD), L.M. Pylee (Education & Revenue), P.K. Krishnankutty Menon (Industries & Labour). After the declaration of general election of 1952, the Kesavan ministry relinquished power on 12 March 1952. The historic Land Reforms Bill was piloted by Kesavan, but failed to pass. The Trivandrum Medical College was opened by Prime Minister Jawaharlal Nehru during Kesavan's tenure.

A controversial statement made by Kesavan before becoming Travancore -Kochi CM is history. When the fire broke out in Sabarimala, during May 1950 in the following months  Kesavan, in his characteristic frankness said, "If a temple is destroyed that much of religious fanaticism will go off."

Personal life 
Kesavan was married to Vasanthi who was the daughter of C. V. Kunhiraman, the founder of Kerala Kaumudi.
His son K. R. Bhadran died in an Air India Dakota plane crash near Mettupalayam in December 1950. At that time Kesavan was living in Ross House at Thiruvananthapuram which was widely considered as a haunted house and bad omen among political class of Kerala.

Autobiography
 
Kesavan's autobiography is Jeevitha Samaram ―Life Struggles in English. He is very candid in his autobiography, in which he elaborately illustrates his struggles in personal and political life. This biography is a good reference material as to have an insight into the turmoils that are remarkable in the pre- and post-independent history of Kerala. It is ironical that the preface to his autobiography was written by none other than his rebellious son K. Balakrishnan, who had vehemently opposed his father on his right-wing political stands; a son writing an introduction to his father's autobiography is an unparalleled occurrence in Malayalam literature.

See also 

 Sree Narayana Dharma Paripalana Yogam
 Government Medical College, Thiruvananthapuram
 Kollam
 Sabarimala
 Travancore-Cochin

References

1891 births
1969 deaths
Politicians from Kollam
People from Kollam
People of the Kingdom of Travancore
Narayana Guru
Indian atheists
University of Madras alumni
Indian independence activists from Kerala
Indian National Congress politicians from Kerala
Malayali politicians
Chief Ministers of Kerala
Chief ministers from Indian National Congress
20th-century Indian lawyers
Travancore–Cochin MLAs 1952–1954
Government Law College, Thiruvananthapuram alumni